Operation Basalt was a small British raid conducted during World War II on Sark during the German occupation of the Channel Islands.

The objective of the raid was of offensive reconnaissance and capturing prisoners.

1st Attempt
The original plan was for the raid to take place on the night of 18–19 September 1942, and was postponed by a day, due to bad weather. Leaving Portland at 2200 it took longer than planned to reach Sark and MTB 344 encountered strong currents on the approach, resulting in an arrival time of 0300. The requirement to depart by 0330 in order to be clear of the German occupied islands before dawn resulted in the operation being aborted. MTB 344 returned safely to Portland at 0530.

2nd Attempt
On the night of 3–4 October 1942 twelve men from the Special Operations Executive commanded No. 62 Commando (also known as the "Small Scale Raiding Force") and No. 12 Commando, left Portland on MTB 344 at 1900 and landed on Sark with the object of offensive reconnaissance and capturing prisoners.

Climbing the cliff at the Hog's Back, between Dixcart Bay and Derrible Bay, the Commando
s were not spotted by German sentries nor did they encounter any guards. Several of the raiders broke into the house of a local. The occupant of the house, Mrs Frances Noel Pittard, proved very informative and advised there were about 20 Germans in the annex to the nearby Dixcart Hotel. She also declined an offer to take her to England.  Mrs Pittard provided the commandos with documents, including local newspapers from Guernsey.

In front of the hotel was a long hut-type building. There was one guard, who was silently killed by Danish commando Anders Lassen, using the commando knife he carried.  This annex comprised a corridor and six rooms wherein were five sleeping Germans, none found to be officers. The men were roused and taken outside  whereafter the Commandos decided to go on to the hotel and capture more of the enemy.  To minimise the guard left with the captives, the Commandos tied the prisoners' hands with the six-foot toggle ropes each carried, and required them to hold up their trousers.  The practice of removing belts and/or braces and tearing open the fly was quite a common technique the Commandos used to make it as difficult as possible for captives to run away. Most of the prisoners when captured were dressed for sleeping, one was naked and was not allowed to dress.

While this was being undertaken, one prisoner, the naked man, escaped and ran off shouting, a general struggle started with the other prisoners. The prisoners were shouting and, fearing the arrival of enemy troops, the raiders elected to return to the beach with the remaining prisoners. Three prisoners made a break, one was instantly shot dead with a .38 revolver, another prisoner, wounded, managed to escape. Whether or not some had freed their hands during the firefight is not established nor if all three broke at the same time. Two were believed shot and one stabbed by Ogden-Brown. The sole remaining prisoner, Obergefreiter Hermann Weinreich, was conveyed safely to England and provided useful information.

Germans on the island were alerted, however the Commandos managed to climb down the cliff, then using their small boat, returned to MTB 344 and made their escape with no injuries.

Three German soldiers had died: the sentry and two prisoners.

Consequences
A few days later, the Germans issued a communiqué implying at least one prisoner had escaped and two were shot while resisting having their hands tied. This coming shortly after the Dieppe Raid where an Allied document reportedly instructed prisoners' hands to be tied. When this was brought to Adolf Hitler's attention, he ordered the shackling of Canadian prisoners, which led to a reciprocating order by British and Canadian authorities for German prisoners being held in Canada.

It is also believed that this raid contributed to Hitler's decision to issue his Commando Order on 18 October 1942 instructing all captured Commandos or Commando-type personnel be executed as a matter of procedure. This order resulted in a number of war crimes being committed.

The newspapers recovered from Sark gave details of the deportation of civilians to Germany, this was the first evidence the British had seen of potential German war crimes in the occupied Channel Islands. The Germans justified the action as being identical to the Allied removal of German civilians from Persia, current day Iran, to Australia that had taken place in 1941. No prosecution took place.

The raid resulted in increased security measures being taken in Sark, mainly through an increase in the number of mines, to 13,000, being laid and the deportation to Germany of 201 Channel Island civilians with 48 Sark civilians, including Mrs Pittard, who had just completed a three-month jail term and Robert Hathaway, the husband of the Dame of Sark, in February 1943. Dame Sybil Hathaway remarked on the raid as it "seemed a heavy price to pay for the capture of one prisoner and a copy of the Guernsey Evening Press".

Participants on 2nd attempt
Names of the soldiers who are known to have participated in the raid:
 Major Geoffrey Appleyard 
 Captain Philip Pinckney (later of 2nd SAS - see also Operation Speedwell)
 Lieut. Anders Lassen (later Major, VC, MC — see also Operation Roast)
 Patrick Dudgeon
 Colin Ogden Smith
 Bruce Ogden Smith
 Graham Young
 James Edgar
 Sergeant Horace 'Brummie' Stokes (later of 2nd SAS - see also Operation Speedwell)
 Corporal Flint
 Bombardier Eric Forster
 Sergeant Joseph "Tim" Robinson (later of 2nd SAS - see also Operation Speedwell)

A Private Redborn claimed to be on the raid, however no official records of anyone under this name exists.

Subsequent raids
David Niven, who participated in Channel raids, states in his autobiography The Moon's a Balloon that the commandos who landed on Sark were taken to the local pub by the locals for a drink.  However, Niven also erroneously stated that there were no German troops on Sark at the time.  Niven's account is almost certainly a reference to Operation Ambassador in July 1940 when 140 men from No. 3 Commando and No. 11 Independent Company landed on Little Sark by mistake, thinking they had landed on Guernsey as part of a larger force.  They found no Germans and eventually returned to their boat, but there are no reports of them meeting with locals or drinking with them.

More than a year later, in December 1943, there was a follow-up raid on Sark by a team of British and French commandos known as Operation Hardtack 7 .  It was a complete failure as two of the four men were killed by German mines as they attempted to cross the Hog's Back, following the same route as the commandos had done in 1942—a known route which was now heavily mined.

See also

Commando Order
No. 62 Commando
German occupation of the Channel Islands
Sark during the German occupation of the Channel Islands

References 

Conflicts in 1942
World War II British Commando raids
Sark
Operations involving British special forces
Military history of the Channel Islands during World War II
1942 in France
October 1942 events